Excelsior, a Latin comparative word often translated as "ever upward" or "even higher", may refer to:

Arts and entertainment

Literature and poetry 
 "Excelsior" (Longfellow), an 1841 poem by Henry Wadsworth Longfellow
 Excelsior (Macedonski), a book of poems by Alexandru Macedonski
 "Excelsior" (short story), a 1948 short story by P. G. Wodehouse
 "Excelsior" (Whitman), a poem by Walt Whitman

Music 
 Excelsior Recordings, a record label from the Netherlands
 Excelsior Brass Band, an 1879-1931 brass band from New Orleans
 "Excelsior", a setting of Longfellow's poem to music by Michael William Balfe
 "Excelsior!", a concert overture by Wilhelm Stenhammar
 "Excelsior", an album by Steven Page

Science fiction 
 Excelsior (comics), in Runaways, a support group for former teenage superheroes
 USS Excelsior, a Federation starship first seen in the movie Star Trek III: The Search for Spock

Journals and newspapers 
 Excélsior, a newspaper published in Mexico City
 Daily Excelsior, a newspaper published in Jammu and Kashmir

Other arts and entertainment 
 Excelsior!, 1901 short film
 TV Excelsior, a defunct Brazilian television network
 Excelsior, an 1881 ballet by Luigi Manzotti
 Excelsior Wet Plate Camera, an early camera model used in the collodion process of photography

Mottos and catchphrases 
 "Excelsior" (motto), official motto of the state of New York
 "Excelsior!", catchphrase of Stan Lee, who often used it at the end of his "Stan's Soapbox" column in Marvel Comics 
 "Excelsior", sign-off of Detroit radio personality Mark Scott
  "Excelsior", motto of the Finnish Army's Special Jaegers
  "Excelsior", mantra of Patrizio "Pat" Solitano, Jr. in the 2012 film Silver Linings Playbook
 "Excelsior!", motto of the fictional  Weldon Institute in Jules Verne's Robur the Conqueror

Sports

Association football 
 Excelsior '31, Rijssen, Netherlands
 Excelsior AC, a Haitian association football club
 Excelsior AC Roubaix, a French association football club
 Excelsior Maassluis, a football club from Maassluis, Netherlands
 Excelsior Mouscron, a former Belgian association football club
 Excelsior Stadium, the home of Airdrie United F.C. of the Scottish Football League Second Division
 AS Excelsior, an association football club from Saint-Joseph, Réunion Island
 Birmingham Excelsior F.C., a defunct English association football club
 F.C. Excelsior, Mexican football club that plays in the Segunda División Profesional
 SBV Excelsior, a Dutch association football club
 SV Excelsior, a Surinamese association football club
 SS Excelsior (football club), a club from Réunion Island established in 1940

Other sports 
 Excelsior Stakes previously the Excelsior Handicap, an American Thoroughbred horse race held annually
 Excelsior Rugby Club, an amateur rugby club in New Zealand
 Excelsior of Brooklyn, an amateur baseball team that played in Brooklyn, New York
 New York Excelsior, an American professional Overwatch eSports team based in New York City, New York
 Brampton Excelsiors (disambiguation)

Schools 
 Excelsior Academy, a school in Newcastle upon Tyne, England
 Excelsior College, in Albany, New York
 Excelsior, a common high school and grammar school name
 Excelsior High School (Norwalk, California) (1903–1981) 
 Excelsior Public School (Excelsior, Minnesota) (1904–1964)
 Excelsior School, a non-denominational school in  Pasadena, California
 Excelsior High School, Washougal, Washington

Hotels and restaurants 
 Excelsior (restaurant), a former restaurant located in Hotel de l'Europe, Amsterdam
 Excelsior, a common hotel name
 Hotel Excelsior, Berlin (1908–1945)
 Hôtel Excelsior, Casablanca (est. 1916)
 Excelsior Hotel Ernst, Cologne (est. 1863)
 The Excelsior (Hong Kong), a hotel in Causeway Bay, Hong Kong

Places

Canada 
 Excelsior, Alberta
 Rural Municipality of Excelsior No. 166, Saskatchewan

South Africa 
 Excelsior, Free State

United States 
 Excelsior, California, former name of Meadow Lake, Nevada County, California
 Excelsior, Georgia
 Excelsior (Oak Ridge, Louisiana), listed on the National Register of Historic Places in Louisiana
 Excelsior, Minnesota
 Excelsior, Missouri
 Excelsior, Atchison County, Missouri
 Excelsior, Nevada
 Excelsior, West Virginia (disambiguation)
 Excelsior, McDowell County, West Virginia
 Excelsior, Upshur County, West Virginia
 Excelsior, Webster County, West Virginia
 Excelsior, Wisconsin (disambiguation)
 Excelsior, Richland County, Wisconsin
 Excelsior, Sauk County, Wisconsin
 The Excelsior District, San Francisco, a neighborhood in San Francisco, California
 Excelsior Geyser in the Middle Geyser Basin of Yellowstone National Park, Wyoming
 Excelsior Mountain (Yosemite), in Yosemite National Park
 Excelsior Mountains, in western Nevada in the United States
 Excelsior Springs, Missouri
 Excelsior Township, Michigan

Transportation 
 Excelsior-Henderson Motorcycle (Belle Plaine, MN), founded in 1993
 Excelsior Motor Manufacturing & Supply Company (Chicago, IL), a U.S. motorcycle manufacturer operating in Chicago from 1907 to 1931
 Henderson Motorcycle, a division of the above company from 1919 to 1931
 Excelsior Super X, a motorcycle made by the above company from 1925 to 1931
 Motorwagenfabrik Excelsior, a Swiss car maker in business between 1896 and 1919
 Compagnie Nationale Excelsior, a Belgian car manufacturer existing between 1904 and 1932
 Excelsior Motor Company, a British bicycle, motorcycle and car maker
 Excelsior Manxman, a motorcycle made by the above company
 Xcelsior (bus), a transit bus manufactured by New Flyer Industries
 Excelsior tank, a British experimental heavy assault tank
 St Croix Excelsior, ultralight aircraft
 Excelsior (smack), the last surviving fishing smack of the Lowestoft fishing fleet and a member of the National Historic Fleet
 SS Excelsior (ship), one of several steam-powered ships named Excelsior

Nature 
 Fraxinus excelsior, the scientific name for the European ash tree
 Excelsior eight-eight (Callicore excelsior), a butterfly of the family Nymphalidae found in South America
 Acraea excelsior, a butterfly of the family Nymphalidae found in eastern Africa

Typefaces 
 "Excelsior", the American term for a three-point font size
 Excelsior (typeface), a serif typeface well-suited to newsprint

Other uses 
 Excelsior (chess problem), a chess problem by Sam Loyd
 Excelsior Amusement Park, located on Lake Minnetonka in the town of Excelsior, Minnesota
 Excelsior Brigade, a New York infantry brigade in the Union Army in the American Civil War
 Excelsior Diamond, a famous diamond, once the largest known
 Excelsior JET, a Java compiler
 Project Excelsior, a high-altitude skydiving project in the 1950s
 Wood wool, commonly known as excelsior, a packing material

See also 
 
 
 Excel (disambiguation)
 Excelsia College